Pawnee Rock, one of the most famous landmarks on the Santa Fe Trail, is located in Pawnee Rock State Park, just north of Pawnee Rock, Kansas, United States.
A memorial monument, picnic area, and pergola have been constructed on the top.  From the top of the pergola is a view the Arkansas river valley and the route of the Santa Fe trail.
Matt Field, who traveled the Santa Fe Trail in 1840, later wrote, "Pawnee Rock springs like a huge wart from the carpeted green of the prairie." Traders, soldiers, and emigrants who stopped, carved their names into the brown sandstone. Some of these names are still visible among the graffiti of the more recent visitors.

Pawnee Rock was added to the National Register of Historic Places around 1970. The site is administrated by the Kansas Historical Society as the Pawnee Rock State Historic Site.

History
Pawnee Rock was long a meeting place of the Comanche, Kiowa, Arapaho and Cheyenne Indians. Numerous battles were fought at Pawnee Rock between the tribes, and as a result, many bones have been found in the soil in the vicinity.
Pawnee Rock was for many years a place where Comanche, Kiowa, Arapaho, Cheyenne, and Pawnee tribes held their councils of war and peace.  Many Indian battles were fought nearby in the days before the white men came to Kansas.

It served as a lookout for travelers on the Santa Fe Trail, as well as a rendezvous and ambush for the Indians.  As a camping spot it afforded some protection against hostile Indians. Many travelers and traders on the Santa Fe trail considered Pawnee Rock the most dangerous place on the Central Plains for encounters with the Indians.
Many of the Plains tribes reportedly used it as an observation point from which they could track and swoop down upon buffalo herds and wagon trains. It was also a landmark for travelers, marking the half waypoint between Missouri and Santa Fe.  In 1848, James Birch, a soldier on his way to the Mexican War, wrote: "Pawnee Rock was covered with names carved by the men who had passed it. It was so full that I could find no place for mine." .

Much of Pawnee Rock was destroyed in the 1870s by the railroad and by settlers for building stone. The remnant was acquired in 1908 by the Woman's Kansas Day Club. In 1909, was given to the State of Kansas as an historic site. On May 24, 1912, a stone monument was dedicated with great celebration before a crowd of some 8,000 onlookers. Pawnee Rock was listed in the National Register of Historic Places in 1970 and today operates as Pawnee Rock State Historic Site.

Naming Pawnee Rock
Many stories have been told to explain how Pawnee Rock got its name. One source for the name comes from the belief that was sacred ground for the Pawnee Indians who held tribal councils on its flat top. Another from a great battle in which a small band of Pawnees were destroyed by a force of Kiowas, Cheyennes, and Arapahos. Both come from Pawnee lore. Among the plainsmen it is said that the Rock got its name in 1826.  Kit Carson was on his first trip west and only seventeen. He was working his passage on a wagon train which near the Rock. While on guard duty, he shot his own mule, thinking it was an attacking Pawnee. His associates commemorated his experience with the name, Pawnee Rock.

Bibliography

 Biographical History of Barton County, Kansas; Tribune Publishing Co.; Great Bend, Kansas; 1912 p 145
 Blackmar, Frank W.; Kansas, A cyclopedia of State History, V. 2; Chicago Standard Publishing Col; 1912; pp 455–457
 Porter, Clyde & Mae Reed and John E. Sunder; Matt Field on the Santa Fe Trail; University of Oklahoma Press; Norman, Oklahoma; 1960
 Survey of Historic Sites and Structures in Kansas; Kansas State Historical Society; Topeka, Kansas; 1957
 Echoes of Pawnee Rock, compiled by Margaret Perkins (Wichita, KS, 1908)

References

External links

 Pawnee Rock Kansas State Historical Society.
 Santa Fe Trail Research

Protected areas of Barton County, Kansas
Santa Fe Trail
Geography of Kansas
Kansas state historic sites
Natural features on the National Register of Historic Places in Kansas
National Register of Historic Places in Barton County, Kansas